Igors Korabļovs (born 23 November 1974 in Riga) is a Latvian football defender, currently playing for FB Gulbene-2005 in the Latvian Higher League. He is also working as the manager of the club.

Korabļovs has previously played for clubs like FK Daugava Riga, FK Ventspils and FC Kryvbas Kryvyi Rih. He played his first match for Latvia in 1998 and participated at Euro 2004.

References

External links
 Latvian Football Federation 
 

1974 births
FC Kryvbas Kryvyi Rih players
FK Rīga players
FK Ventspils players
Daugava Rīga players
Association football defenders
Latvia international footballers
Latvian footballers
Latvian people of Russian descent
Latvian expatriate footballers
Expatriate footballers in Ukraine
Latvian expatriate sportspeople in Ukraine
Ukrainian Premier League players
Living people
Footballers from Riga
UEFA Euro 2004 players
FB Gulbene players
JFK Olimps players